Richard David Cooper (born 7 May 1965) is an English retired footballer. He played as a midfielder for Sheffield United, Lincoln City and Exeter City in the Football League. He was the grandson of Doncaster Rovers legend Syd Bycroft.

Coaching career
In August 2000, Cooper returned to Lincoln City to run its newly formed Grass Roots Section. The scheme would involve the club opening Soccer Schools, for all, throughout the county of Lincolnshire but mainly in rural areas to enable youngsters aged between five and eleven  to receive qualified coaching. After four years in the role, and having completed his UEFA 'A' licence, he left the club to succeed Phil Stant as Football Development Centre Coach/Tutor at Newark and Sherwood College. He combined this with a job as a member of the Manchester United's Overseas Development Team. After two years away from Sincil Bank, he returned to Lincoln City as Director of the Girls Centre of Excellence and manager of the Football in the Community scheme In March 2010, the club's Football in the Community scheme was relaunched as the Lincoln City F.C. Sport and Education Trust, a non-profit charity whose work is regulated by The Football League Trust, a move which saw Cooper assume his current role as Lincoln City F.C. Sport and Education Trust Manager.

Ahead of the 2018-19 season, Cooper became manager of Lincoln City Women (then Nettleham Ladies). The team competes in the FA Women's National League. He left by mutual consent in January 2021, when Lincoln were third in the league.

References

External links
Lincoln City F.C. Official Archive Profile
Yeovil Town Career Statistics

1965 births
Living people
English footballers
Association football midfielders
Sheffield United F.C. players
Lincoln City F.C. players
Exeter City F.C. players
Yeovil Town F.C. players
Gainsborough Trinity F.C. players
Spalding United F.C. players
English Football League players
Weymouth F.C. players